The Act to Make Provisions for the Prohibition of Relationship Between Persons of the Same Sex, Celebration of Marriage by Them, and for Other Matters Connected Therewith, also known as the Same Sex (Prohibition) Act 2006, was a controversial draft bill that was first put before the both houses of the National Assembly of Nigeria in early 2007. Seven years later, another draft was passed into legislation by president Goodluck Jonathan as the Same Sex Marriage (Prohibition) Act 2013.

History
It was first placed to the National Assembly by Justice Minister Bayo Ojo on January 18, 2006, but it wasn't passed during the first reading. On January 18, 2007 the bill was approved by the FEC and resent before the National Assembly. However, it received condemnation from human rights organizations for its restrictions on freedom of speech and organization, potentially placing Nigeria at odds with several international agreements to which the country is signatory; it was also seen in Nigeria as being a last-ditch election-year effort of the Obasanjo administration to appeal to public sentiment, since the second reading of the bill was being pushed after the Senate's defeat of a bill to amend the Constitution's limit on the number of presidential terms. As a result, the bill was not passed by either house before the general election that year.

Details
The proposed bill calls for five years imprisonment for anyone who undergoes, "performs, witnesses, aids, or abets" a same-sex marriage. It would also prohibit any display of a "same-sex amorous relationship" and adoption of children by gays or lesbians. The bill is expected to receive little or no opposition in Parliament.

The same bill would also call for five years imprisonment for involvement in public advocacy or associations supporting the rights of lesbian and gay people. Included in the bill is a proposal to ban any form of relationship with a gay person. The intent of the bill is to ban anything associated with being gay in the country.

Reaction

Domestic
The overwhelming majority of Nigerians were in full support of this legislation as it reflected the desire of the people who do not see it as a fundamental human right issue.

Of the few dissenting voices, one of the stiffest domestic opponents of the legislation was Davis Mac-Iyalla, a homosexual Nigerian LGBT rights advocate who heads the Nigerian chapter of Changing Attitude, an Anglican pro-LGBT organization based in the United Kingdom. Mac-Iyalla, who was repeatedly arrested by Nigerian police in pro-LGBT demonstrations in previous years, was already an opponent of Peter Akinola, the current Anglican Primate of the Church of Nigeria.

International
In February 2006, the United States State Department attacked the proposal. In March 2006, 16 international human rights groups signed a letter condemning the bill, calling it a violation of the freedoms of expression, association and assembly guaranteed by international law as well as by the African Charter on Human and Peoples' Rights and a barrier to the struggle against the spread of HIV/AIDS in Nigeria. Some sources claim that Nigeria has the world's third-highest population of persons with AIDS: 3.6 million Nigerians are infected with HIV. But the Nigerian governmental organisation in charge of control of HIV/AIDS cater specifically for homosexual patients through the Nigerian Diversities Network (NDN). NDN has a mission of working in partnership with all key stakeholders (including homosexual people) to significantly reduce the HIV/AIDS vulnerability. The NDN works closely with government departments through its offices in the national and state capitals.

MassResistance praised the passing of the Nigerian Bill by stating Nigeria is “taking bold steps to fight back” against attempts “to subvert public morality”.

Legislation in 2014
Despite international pressure, the Same Sex Marriage (Prohibition) Act 2013 was signed by President Goodluck Jonathan and dated January 7, 2014.  US Secretary of State John Kerry said the United States is "deeply concerned" by a law that "dangerously restricts freedom of assembly, association, and expression for all Nigerians." Former coloniser Britain said, "The U.K. opposes any form of discrimination on the grounds of sexual orientation." Two months later, the ban on gay marriage in the United Kingdom was lifted.

The Nigerian law already had provisions making homosexual sex illegal. The 2013 Act adds to this, "A person who registers, operates or participates in gay clubs, societies or organizations, or directly or indirectly makes public show of same-sex amorous relationship in Nigeria commits an offense and is liable on conviction to a term of 10 years." The bill is widely supported in Nigeria. In a survey of the U.S. Pew Research Center in 2013, 98 percent of the Nigerian respondents said society should not accept homosexuality.

In 2018, LGBT activists who have worked extensively in the country on LGBT issues and court cases involving LGBT persons all agree that the law has never been used to convict anyone in any homosexuality-related cases. This, they believe, is because the law itself is incoherent. In addition, many cases involving suspected LGBT persons lack proper evidence and sometimes there’s no evidence at all. That makes it impossible for prosecutors to present a winnable case and  prove that any crime has been committed.

See also
LGBT rights in Nigeria
Recognition of same-sex unions in Nigeria

References

External links
 Full text of the 2006 proposal
 Full text of the 2013 Act
 Human Rights, Homosexuality and the Anglican Communion: Reflections in Light of Nigeria

LGBT rights in Nigeria
Law of Nigeria
2007 in Nigeria
2007 in law
2007 in LGBT history

de:Homosexualität in Nigeria